This is a list of rural localities in Tula Oblast. Tula Oblast (Tulskaya oblast) is a top-level political division of European Russia (namely an oblast). Its  present borders were set on 26 September 1937. The city of Tula is its administrative center. Since 2 February 2016, the current governor of the oblast has been Alexey Dyumin.

Locations 
 Arkhangelskoye
 Chermoshnya
 Iskan
 Kazakovka
 Kobylinka
 Krapivna
 Leninsky
 Lipovo
 Lukino
 Lukovitsy
 Olen
 Sonino
 Taydakovo
 Telezhyonka
 Temyan
 Toropovo
 Velmino

See also 
 
 Lists of rural localities in Russia

References 

Tula Oblast